R. S. Karthiik is an Indian actor who has appeared in Tamil language films. After making his film debut in the Tamil film Achcham Yenbadhu Madamaiyada (2016), he has been in films including Maanagaram (2017), Peechankai (2017), Yennanga Sir Unga Sattam (2021) and Parole (2022).

Career
Karthiik made his acting debut in a minor role in Gautham Vasudev Menon's Achcham Yenbadhu Madamaiyada (2016), before appearing in a supporting role in Lokesh Kanagaraj's Maanagaram (2017). Karthiik's first lead role was in Peechankai (2017), a black comedy about an individual with alien hand syndrome, which he co-produced. The film had earlier been made by the same team as a telefilm, with the director choosing to retain Karthiik in the lead role. The film won positive reviews from critics but had little impact at the Chennai box office. The film however won Karthiik attention from new filmmakers, leading to four other film offers. During late 2018 and 2019, he worked extensively on the production of a film on koothu co-starring Manishajith, but the film did not have a theatrical release.

Karthiik next appeared in the political satire film, Yennanga Sir Unga Sattam (2021), where he portrayed two different roles. The film opened to mixed reviews from critics. In 2022, Karthiik played the lead role in Dwarakh Raja's crime thriller Parole (2022).

Filmography

References

External links

R S KARTHIIK at Instagram
R S Karthiik at Facebook

Indian film actors
Tamil actors
Living people
Actors in Tamil cinema
Year of birth missing (living people)
21st-century Indian actors
Male actors in Tamil cinema